Yavuz Ağralı (born 9 April 1992) is a Turkish long-distance running athlete who will compete in the marathon for Turkey at the 2020 Summer Olympics.

Yavuz Ağralı was born in Bingöl, eastern Turkey on 9 April 1992. Competing in marathon, he is a member of the  Zeytinburnu Beştelsiz S.C. in Istanbul.

Ağralı became runner-up at the 2014 Zagreb Half Marathon, held within the Balkan Half Marathon Championships. He won the Zagreb Marathon with 2:18:22 held within the 2017 Balkan Marathon Championships. In 2020, he took the silver medal a second time at the Zagreb Half Marathon.

On 23 February 2021, he participated at the Seville Marathon, where he passed the Olympic minimum limit. He then completed a 130-day training camp in Ethiopia, and went to his hometown Bingöl after his return to Turkey. The Turkish Athletic Federation selected him for participation at the 2020 Summer Olympics.

References

External links
 

1992 births
Living people
Sportspeople from Bingöl
Turkish male long-distance runners
Athletes (track and field) at the 2020 Summer Olympics
Olympic athletes of Turkey
Olympic male marathon runners
20th-century Turkish people
21st-century Turkish people